was a Japanese samurai of Satsuma Domain during Edo period, later became a bureaucrat of Ryukyu Kingdom.

Tōma Jūchin was born to a Japanese clan, Ijichi-shi of Ōsumi Province, and was given the name . He was a descendant Hatakeyama Shigetada.

After Satsuma's invasion of Ryukyu in 1609, Ryukyu were getting poorer and poorer. Ryukyu had to borrowed money from Satsuma, but the debt was getting heavier and heavier and Ryukyu was unable to pay off it. Tōma Jūchin established government monopoly system of muscovado and turmeric in 1645, which alleviated the intense economic difficulties faced by the kingdom successfully. He also minted  in 1656.

References

1591 births
1676 deaths
People from Satsuma Domain
People of Edo-period Japan
People of the Ryukyu Kingdom
Ryukyuan people
16th-century Ryukyuan people
17th-century Ryukyuan people